Van Gogh Vodka produces unflavored vodka, flavored vodka, and gin. The vodka was introduced in January 2000 and is produced at Distillery Cooymans International in Tilburg, the Netherlands. Van Gogh currently produces a total of 25 expressions, 16 of which are available in the U.S.

Van Gogh Vodka is owned by Luctor International and is sold in the United States, Europe, Israel, the Far East, Australia, New Zealand, Caribbean, Canada, South Africa and Central America. In the U.S., Van Gogh is imported by 375 Park Avenue Spirits.

The company produce many flavoured vodkas in addition to their basic products.

Expressions

Distillation 
The Royal Dirkzwager Distillery has created Van Gogh Vodka for 133 years by handcrafting vodka in small batches using combinations of wheat, corn and barley. The vodka is distilled twice in column stills and then a third time in a traditional pot still to produce a high quality vodka. Copper is used in the process to remove the harshness of the product.

References

External links 
 Official Web Site
 Van Gogh Vodka on MySpace
Corporate website for Luctor International, L.L.C.
375 Park Avenue Spirits

Luxury brands
Dutch vodkas
Schiedam